Lovers in Quarantine is an extant 1925 American silent comedy film starring Bebe Daniels and directed by Frank Tuttle. It was produced by Famous Players-Lasky and distributed by Paramount Pictures. The film is based on a 1924 Broadway play Quarantine by F. Tennyson Jesse. The film entered the public domain on January 1, 2021.

Cast

Preservation
A print of Lovers in Quarantine is preserved at the Library of Congress.

References

External links

Lobby card

American silent feature films
American films based on plays
Films directed by Frank Tuttle
1926 comedy films
1926 films
Silent American comedy films
American black-and-white films
Surviving American silent films
1925 comedy films
1920s English-language films
1920s American films